Baldwin of Constantinople may refer to:

 Baldwin I of Constantinople (also Baldwin IX of Flanders and Baldwin VI, Count of Hainaut, 1172–1205)
 Baldwin II of Constantinople (1217–1273)

See also
Baldwin (name)